Monotype fonts were developed by the Monotype company. This name has been used by three firms. Two of them had their roots in "hot metal" or lead type in the printing industry. They did not adapt when the market changed as computer, offset and photographic systems became dominant. These were:

 Lanston Monotype Cooperation in Philadelphia, USA
 The Monotype Corporation Limited in Salfords, UK

A third firm produces fonts for computer use:
 Monotype Imaging Inc.

The latter firm is in a sense the successor to the English Monotype factory. It has the rights to the original designs, and later obtained rights to many more designs from other sources. The remains of the production archive and what is left of the machines are at the Type Museum in London, England. There the original matrices can still be accessed and parts of the old machines ordered. The collection itself is the property of the British Science Museum. The survival of the Type Museum is threatened since the building is no longer owned by the Science Museum, is in a very poor state of repair, and the new owner intends other uses for the property.

Hot metal

The first two firms mentioned above produced a long list of fonts, which were identified by names and serial numbers. That type design eventually acquired a very good name and the "Monotype" brand was synonymous with high quality and reliability. 
 
In their name much typographic research on historical character designs from the early years of typography has been carried out. Many of the letters were produced as "revivals" , including characters in Garamond, Baskerville, Bodoni, Bembo, Caslon and many other typefaces.

The major difference between the two firms is that the American fonts do not match the English fonts. Letters with the same name had in most cases a different designer, and their appearance and implementation differ. The identification numbers do not all correspond.

The matrices of the two firms also differ in terms of depth, the image inside the matrix, implementation, and size. For example, the American matrices are shallower by 0.025  mm (0.010   inch), and consequently the interior of American foundry moulds need to be higher to produce characters with a type height of 23.3  mm (0.918   inch). This was one of many measures taken by the two Monotype companies to divide the world market between themselves. For example, the Americans served the Americas and the Canadian markets. The British company, The Monotype Corporation Ltd. in Salfords, had many customers in India, Africa, and Asia. For these countries many non-Latin typefaces were created for printing in Hebrew, Javanese, Sanskrit, Sinhala, Thai, and other languages.

The composition-caster machines of The Monotype Corporation produced ready-to-use composed pages with text consisting of single pieces of type. The machine provided filled lines, justifying them by adding spaces of varying widths. These ending machines were controlled with a paper ribbon. Typing the texts on keyboards was manual work that took much more time than casting. A composition-caster needed the ribbons of at least three separate keyboards. Correction of the final composition was accomplished by simply replacing the moveable type. The lines did not need to be recast, as with Linotype machines.

These composition-casters could produce type in sizes up to 14 point pica or Didot font width. "Large-composition" customized machines and moulds could provide composition up to 36 points. The matrices are correspondingly larger and there is room for only one alphabet in the die case. For this reason one machine-run could not provide composition in both Roman and italic typeface, so additional hand work was required in such cases.

Type for hand-composing was also cast with Monotype machines; all characters up to 36pt, and rules, could be cast on a large-composition machine. Another machine was the "super-caster" or "supra", which could cast single type. After conversion it could also be used to cast any material needed in print shops, including reglettes, ornaments, and similar designs, as well as characters up to 72 points. There were moulds with inserts for sizes 14 to 36 point. For the even larger sizes of 42, 48, 60 and 72 point another type cast was used. The machine had to be reconfigured for each different type requirement.

Unit arrangement
The width of the hot-lead Monotype type is expressed in units of a set. The widest letter in the alphabet, usually the capital "W", was measured in quarter-pica points, a unit being  part of this width. 
The unit width is calculated as follows for a 12-set example.

 1 pica =  inch
 1 pica point =  ×  inch = 0.013889 inch
 1 unit 1 set =  ×  ×  =  inch = 0.000771605 inch
 1 unit 12 set =  = 0.00925926 inch

All character were designed to have widths a whole number of units of the set. 5, 6, 7, 8, 9, 10, up to 18 or even more.

 5 units 12 set = 0.046296 inch
 6 units 12 set = 0.055555
 7 units 12 set = 0.064815
.....
 18 units 12 set = 0.1667 inch 
 
English and American manuals use a different size for the pica: the new-pica = 0.1660 inch. On the European mainland all wedges and tables in the manuals are based on the "old" pica = 0.1667 inch and those wedges can be identified by the extra capital E (= English). That gives small differences in the tables in the various manuals. In practice, however, these differences are so small that they make only little difference when cast with a S5-E wedge or a S5 wedge based on the new-pica. All character are designed to have as width a whole number of units of the set.

So, for instance, A=14, B=13, C=14... a=8, b,d,h,k,n,p,q=10, c=8 ... The list with these widths is called the "unit-arrangement" (UA). Different fonts can have the same UA. In some font designs the unit-arrangement can be different for each point size, for example, with the Lutetia (typeface) and some other fonts of Jan van Krimpen. These UAs are essential for the layout of the matrix case, in which the matrices are sorted into rows by the unit widths. The various "unit-arrangements" have been given numbers.

Long and short descenders 
The letters g j p q y ij are descenders. In the italic typefaces f and the "long s" are also descenders.

Many of the older fonts were intended mainly for use in newspaper columns. Times New Roman is a good example, but there were many others. The descenders were kept as short as possible in such fonts so that all the text could be set with the same line spacing. However, for many fonts for luxury productions longer variants of the descenders were also available—the lining would usually need to be adjusted to accommodate them when casting.

Letterpress printing 
The design of fonts for letterpress printing needs to be adjusted for this technique. The reason is that the type is printed with some force on the paper, pressing the ink on the type out to the edges of the letter. The center of the character is accordingly printed a bit lighter than the edges. This results in what is called a "bead edge". It is further enhanced because not only the surface of the type get inked, but also the bevels around it, which also contributes to the visual effect of the printed typeface, as can be readily seen with a magnifying glass.

The bead edge and bright centre in print suggest a calligraphic typeface. And with letterpress there is a much wider choice of suitable, often more expensive, paper types that can be printed.

Computer adjustments
After the "hot metal" firms ceased production because of the transition from letterpress to offset printing in more and more printing companies, with Lanston Monotype being the first to do so in America, the font designs needed adjustment for computer use. There is a difference compared with the old hot-metal characters since the fixed relationship between the width of the letters in the unit arrangement is often experienced as a disadvantage. Discussion of this problem has long been going on, for example by Jan van Krimpen.

The design of a lead type cannot be copied without some adjustments since the pressure on lead type during printing presses the ink sideways, and the final appearance of the letter on paper is wider than the surface of the lead character. This extra width is not the same at all places around the character. It depends on the paper surface used, the pressure, the type of press, whether cylinder or platten, and many other factors.

Many digital fonts from the early digital age have this characteristic defect. The metal surface was simply copied, the result being that the color of the printed pages is far too light. In offset or other modern printing techniques, the typeface on the plate and on the printed letter now match much more closely.  The use of mostly coated papers with offset types also has an effect. During the type design process all this should be taken into account since simple design drawing of the surface of a lead letter without any adjustment for offset or computer printing will not produce a good result.

List of typefaces
The alphabetical list below refers primarily to the fonts produced by the English "hot metal" Monotype company. The numbers mentioned below are from the English "specimen-blades", four editions of the booklets "Monotype book of information", and some additional information from the London Type Museum.

In the 1960s many Monotype fonts were discontinued. The "patterns" for the originals from which the punches were created, the punches, and the whole stock of remaining matrices were destroyed. The font has disappeared except for the matrices in the possession of various printers. Sample sheets of these fonts are particularly difficult to find and are lacking in many collections.

A small number of American letter designs are added to the list, designated by "Am" and their number. American matrices differ from those in England. American matrices were 0.0025   mm (0.0010   inch) less deeply engraved. Consequently, the American moulds were 0.0025   mm (0.0010   inch) higher internally compared with moulds from the factory in Salfords UK. Consequently, American matrices on an English cast produce a low letter. English matrices on American moulds produce French-height type.

The list of computer letters from Monotype Imaging, Inc. is constantly being modified and can be best consulted on the website of the company.<ref>N.N.,  Specimen book of "Monotype" printing types ' ', The Monotype Corporation LIMITED, 43 Fetter Lane, London EC4, 4 vols</ref>

Latin fonts

A
 Acier
 297: Acier (never released)
 319: Acier Grey and White (never released)
Albertus
 481: Albertus Roman introduction: 1935
 display matrices:

 538: Albertus bold titling Roman introduction: 1938
 display matrices:

 534: Albertus light Roman introduction: 1940
 display matrices, one size: 24pt line .2652
 324: Albertus titling Roman (1940 ?)
 display matrices:

Albion
 __5: Albion Roman composition matrices UA.2 = 6pt - 12pt

 _42: Albion (No 2) Roman composition matrices UA.2 = 6.5pt - 12pt

 _63: Albion Roman UA.2 : 6.5 pt - 13pt

 _70: Albion (No 4) Roman composition matrices: UA.2 : 6.5pt - 13pt

 _74: Albion Extended Roman composition matrices: UA.3:  6D - 13pt

 display matrices:

 264: Albion (in 1965 taken out of production)
 Aldine Bembo
 270: Aldine Bembo (see: Bembo 270)
 370: Aldine Bembo Titling (see: Bembo Titling)
 Anchor
 491: Anchor (taken out of production, "cancelled")
Andalé Mono
 Only produced for computer use.
Angulus
 555: Angulus Roman/italic composition matrices: UA.474: only one size available 4.4pt

Antique
 207: Antique Roman/italic (see: 207 Antique Old Style)
 307: Antique (in 1965 taken out of production)
 composition matrices: U.A. = 70, only: 5.5pt and 7pt

 407: Antique (in 1965 taken out of production)
composition matrices: UA = 70

 354: Antique (No.2) (in 1967 taken out of production)
 composition matrices: UA = 335

 _74: Antique Extended (see Ionic, see: Albion Extended)
 153: Antique Extended (see: Albion Extended)
 223: Antique Heavy (see: Devonshire Bold)
 224: Antique Heavy Condensed (see: Devonshire Bold Condensed)
 Antique Latin __9: Antique Latin (see: Latin Antique)
 _60: Antique Latin (see: Latin Antique No.2)
 _78: Antique Latin (see: Latin Antique No.3)
 _84: Antique Latin (see: Latin Antique No.4)
 Antique Old Style
 __3: Antique Old Style No.3 Roman/italic
 composition matrices: UA.2 = 6pt - 12pt

 161: Antique Old Style No.3 Roman/italic
 composition matrices: Roman UA.29, italic UA.54, 6pt - 12pt

 display matrices:

 124: Antique Old Style No.1 synonyms: Old Style Antique and Series 124 (in 1967 taken out of production)
 all descenders available in two versions short- and long-descenders composition matrices: UA.1, 6pt - 12pt (6pt is missing on older specimen blades)

 207: Antique Old Style Roman/italic
 composition matrices: UA.70 = 6.5pt - 10pt

Arial
 No matrices for hot-metal
 Arrighi Italic 252: Arrighi Italic (see: Centaur)
 Ashley Crawford 238: Ashley Crawford (cancelled in 1967)
 display matrices:

 279: Ashley Crawford Plain (cancelled in 1967)
 display matrices:

Ashley Script
 574: Ashley Script display matrices: 14-72 pt

Avenir
 No matrices for hot-metal

B
Barbou
 178: Barbou Roman/italic
 composition matrices: UA.447:  8 - 12pt

Baskerville
 169: Baskerville Roman/italic
 composition matrices: UA.43:  6D - 14pt

 large-composition matrices: 14-18pt Roman UA.136, italic UA.141:
 22pt: only Roman, 24pt: Roman UA.136, italic UA.150

 display matrices:

 312: Baskerville bold Roman/italic
 composition matrices: UA.332:  6D - 14pt

 display matrices:

 313: Baskerville bold (see: 313 Baskerville Semi-Bold)
 377: Baskerville Bold Large Face (cancelled in 1967)
 display matrices:

 376: Baskerville Bold Titling For Newspaper Headings (cancelled in 1965)
 large-composition matrices: UA.374:  14pt, 18pt and 24pt cast at 18pt combined in one matrix frame

 378: Baskerville Bold Titling For Newspaper Headings) (cancelled in 1965)
 large-composition matrices: UA.372:  14pt, 18pt and 24pt cast at 18pt combined in one matrix frame

 380: Baskerville Extra Bold Titling (cancelled in 1967)
 display matrices:

 312: Baskerville Heavy (see: 312 Baskerville Bold)
 313: Baskerville Semi-Bold Roman/italic
 composition matrices: UA.332:  6D - 14pt

 display matrices:

 381: Baskerville Titling For Newspaper Headings (cancelled in 1965)
 large-composition matrices: UA.372:  14pt, 18pt and 24pt cast at 18pt combined in one die case

Bell (by Monotype inc. revised version)
 341: Bell Roman/italic
 composition matrices: UA.314:  8D - 14pt

 display matrices:

 619: Bell Gothic Roman
 composition matrices: UA.445:  6 and 8pt

 620: Bell Gothic Bold Roman
 composition matrices: UA.445:  6 and 8pt

Bembo
 270: Bembo Roman/italic
 composition matrices: UA.91: 6D - 14pt
 variants: alternative numerals: F537, F538, alternative capitals: R 203, M 145, R 224

 large-composition matrices: 14pt-24pt

 display matrices:

 428: Bembo bold Roman/italic
 composition matrices: UA.368:  6D - 14pt

 large-composition matrices: 14pt-18pt

 display matrices:

 294: Bembo condensed Italic italic
 composition matrices: UA.360:  10pt - 13pt UA.361: 16pt

 428: Bembo Heavy (see: 428 Bembo Bold)
 509: Bembo semi-bold Roman/italic
 composition matrices: UA.91:  5.5pt

 370: Bembo titling Roman/italic
 display matrices:

 Berling
 643: Berling Roman/italic (cancelled in 1973)
 punches made in cooperation with Berlinska Stilgjuteriet, Lund
 composition matrices: UA.495:  6D-12D

 644: Berling semi bold Roman
 punches made in cooperation with Berlinska Stilgjuteriet, Lund
 composition matrices: UA.496: 6D-12D

 Bernard condensed
 213: Bernard condensed Roman
 display matrices:

 Blado
 119: Blado Italic italic (designed to be used with Poliphilus 170)
 composition matrices: UA.53: 10pt - 13pt

 large-composition matrices: 16pt = UA.142

 display matrices:Bodoni 135: Bodoni Roman/italic (synonym: Bodoni no.3)
 composition matrices: UA.1:  6pt-13pt , UA.77: 14pt
 variants: long descenders and "Large-Face" in 11pt

 large-composition matrices: 16pt, 18pt, 24pt Roman, UA.425 = 24pt italic

 display matrices:

 254: Bodoni No.2 (see also: 357 Bodoni No.2) (cancelled in 1967)
 display matrices: 4 sizes

 288: Bodoni No.1 (cancelled in 1967)
 composition matrices: UA.364: 10D-12D-14D

 357: Bodoni No.2 Roman/italic (see: 357 Bodoni Book)
 composition matrices: UA.319: 8pt-12pt

 504: Bodoni No 5 Roman/italic (see: 504 Bodoni 357)
 composition matrices: UA.319:  8pt-12pt

 195: Bodoni Bold Roman
 composition matrices: UA.3:  6pt-12pt

 display matrices:

 260: Bodoni Bold Roman/italic, Vette variant for series 135
 composition matrices: Roman UA.2 italic UA.143: 6pt-13pt; Roman UA.417, italic UA.143: 14pt
 long descenders available and "large face" in 11pt

 display matrices:

 529: Bodoni Bold Condensed Roman/italic
 display matrices:

 760: Bodoni Bold Titling Roman
 display matrices:

 357: Bodoni Book Roman/italic
 composition matrices: UA.319:  8pt-12pt

 260: Bodoni Heavy Roman/italic (see: 260 Bodoni Bold)
 529: Bodoni Heavy condensed Roman/italic (see: 529 Bodoni Bold condensed)
 120: Bodoni ultra bold Roman/italic
 display matrices:

 Bold Face
 _53: Bold Face (see: 53 Old Style Bold)
 167: Bold Face (see: 167 De Vinne Italic)
 366: Bold Face (see: 366 Inflex Bold)
 245: Bold Face Italic No.2 (see: 245 Old Style Bold Italic)
 253: Bold Face No.2 (see: 253 Old Style Bold)
 138: Bold Face No.3 Roman. (cancelled in 1965)
 composition matrices: UA.3:  9pt

 503: Bold Face (cancelled in 1965)
 176: Bold Face Outline (see: 176 Old Style Bold Outline)
 253: Bold Face Special Line (see: 253 Old Style Bold)
 167: Bold Italic (see: 167 De Vinne Italic series No. 167)
 334: Bold (The Times) (see: 334 Times Bold)
 345: Bold (The Times) (see: 345 Times Bold)
 360: Bold (The Times) (see: 360 Times Bold)
Braggadocio
 278: Braggadocio Roman
 display matrices:

 Breitkopf 466: Breitkopf romain (cancelled in 1936)
 Broadway a306: Broadway (Sorts) (cancelled before 1966)
 a307: Broadway Engraved (Sorts) (cancelled before 1966)
 Bruce Rogers 494: Bruce Rogers (cancelled in 1967)
 594: Bruce Rogers Titling (in research)
Bulmer
 469: Bulmer Roman/italic
 composition matrices: UA.412:  11pt-12pt

C
 Calendar L17: Calendar Figures Roman
 L19: Calendar Days Roman
Calisto
 Canterbury197: Canterbury (cancelled in 1967)
 composition matrices: UA.57 = 8-12pt

 display matrices:Caslon 128: Caslon Roman/italic
 composition matrices: UA.57 = 8-12pt

 large composition: 18pt - 24pt,

 display matrices:

 209: Caslon Titling Roman
 display matrices:

Castellar
 600: Castellar Roman
Title typeface drawn by John Peters in 1957 based on engraved Roman square capitals.Castellar font family at Microsoft Typography
 display matrices:

Centaur
 252: Centaur Roman/italic, also known under the name: Arrighi composition matrices: UA.90 = 6-14pt,  UA.322 = 14pt

 large composition: 14pt - 24pt, UA.165 = Roman, UA.166 = italic

 display matrices:

 352: Centaur Roman/italic
 large composition matrices only 18pt

 295: Centaur Titling Roman
 Century
 227: Century No.2 Roman/italic (see: 227 Century Schoolbook)
 211: Century No.1 Roman (synonym: 211 Modern)
 composition matrices UA.1 = 8pt

 545: Century Bold (cancelled in 1967)
 546: Century Bold Extended (cancelled in 1967)
 227: Century Schoolbook Roman/italic
 composition matrices: UA.369 = 6-14pt,  UA.322 = 14pt

 large composition: 18pt - 20pt only Roman UA.370

 477: Century Schoolbook Bold Roman
 composition matrices: UA.498 = 6-14pt,

 650: Century Schoolbook Roman/italic
 display matrices:

 651: Century Schoolbook Bold Roman
 display matrices:Century Gothic display matrices:

 Chatsworth510: Chatsworth (cancelled in 1965)
 At the request of Stephenson and Blake, Sheffield produced for them in one size.
 composition matrices: UA.391 = 10pt,

 Chiswell Old Face
 154: Chiswell Old face Roman/italic
 display matrices:

 Clarendon
 _12: Clarendon Roman
 composition matrices: UA.2 = 5-12pt,

 412: Clarendon No.2 (cancelled in 1967)
 composition matrices: UA.2 = 5-12pt,

 501: Clarendon Timetable (cancelled in 1967)
 Clearface Bold
 157: Clearface Bold Roman/italic
 composition matrices: UA.2 = 6-12pt,

 display matrices:

 Cloister 271: Cloister Bold (cancelled in 1967)
 composition matrices: UA.86 = 6-12pt,

 272: Cloister Old Style (cancelled in 1967)
 composition matrices: UA.89 = 6-12pt,

 a395: Cloister Old Style (Sorts) (cancelled before 1966)
 Cochin
 165: Cochin Roman/italic
 composition matrices: UA.67 = 6D-13pt, UA.174 = 14pt Roman, UA.173 = 14pt italic

 display matrices:

 225: Colonna Roman
 display matrices:

 Condensa
 511: Condensa italic
 display matrices:

 Condensed 213: Condensed Bold (see: 213 Bernard Condensed)
 224; Condensed Heavy Antique (see: 224 Devonshire Bold Condensed)
 383: Condensed Heavy Grotesque (see: 383 Grotesque Condensed)
 523: Condensed Heavy Grotesque Titling (see: 523 Grotesque Condensed)
 419: Condensed Latin (see: 419 Grotesque Condensed Titling)
 Crossword 306: Crossword Puzzle Solutions composition matrices: 11pt
 11pt: 28 matrices, ABCDEFGHIJKLMNOPQRSTUVWXYZ + empty field + shaded area, the matrices were cast on squares, with a flat wedge.
 306: Crossword Puzzle Specials 18pt: S 2612 t/m S 2641 = 1 t/m 30, S2727 t/m S2746 = 31-50, S3976 t/m S3986 = 51-61, S2643 = leeg veld, S2611 = gearceerd veld
309: Crossword Squares (cancelled)
 Cushing _17: Cushing (cancelled in 1967)
 composition matrices UA.1 = 6pt - 13ptCurlzD
 Daily Mail Modern326: Daily Mail Modern (cancelled in 1974)
Dante
This font was the last design of Giovanni Mardersteig. Charles Malin, the engraver producing the punches for Mardesteig died in 1955. After this event Mardersteig did not want any more new designs. In his opinion punches made with a pantograph were inferior. The character was later adapted for composition casters by Monotype and released in 1957.
 592: Dante Roman/italic
 composition matrices: UA.441, 6D-14D

 display matrices

 682: Dante Semi Bold Roman/italic
 composition matrices: UA.504, 6D-14D

 612: Dante Titling Roman
 display matrices

 Deutsch Romisch 298: Deutsch Romisch (cancelled in 1970)
 composition matrices: UA.303, 6D-12D

 286: Deutsch Romisch Bold (cancelled in 1967)
 composition matrices: UA.304, 8D-10D

 De Vinne 131: De Vinne (cancelled in 1967
 composition matrices: UA.400, 8pt

 display matrices

 _21: De Vinne (see: De Vinne Condensed)
 _21: De Vinne Condensed (cancelled in 1967)
 composition matrices: UA.2 6.5pt - 12 pt

 167: De Vinne Italic (synonym: Bold Italic Series No. 167) (cancelled in 1967)
 composition matrices: UA.3 7.5pt - 11 pt

 Devonshire 223: Devonshire Bold (synonym: 223 Heavy Antique (cancelled in 1967)
 display matrices

 224: Devonshire Bold Condensed (synonym: 224 Condensed Heavy Antique) (cancelled in 1967)
 display matrices

 Didot
 _71: Didot Roman/italic
 composition matrices: UA.1 6.5pt - 13pt

 Divina Comedia 425: Divina Comedia (destroyed in a bombardment)
 Dorchester Script
 436 Dorcherster script display matrices

E
 Egyptian
 107: Egyptian No.1 Roman
 composition matrices: UA.2 = 6-12pt

 171: Egyptian (synonym: 171 Egyptian Bold) (cancelled in 1967)
 composition matrices: UA.39 = 9pt

 173: Egyptian No.4 Roman
 display matrices:

 129: Egyptian Roman (see: Egyptian Bold nr.1 en: 251)
 130: Egyptian (cancelled in 1967)
 composition matrices: UA.3 = 8pt

 162: Egyptian No.3 (cancelled in 1967)
 composition matrices: UA.3 = 8pt

 184: Egyptian (see: 184 Ionic No.3)
 241: Egyptian 251: Egyptian (see: Egyptian Condensed)
 330: Egyptian (see: Egyptian Bold)
 129: Egyptian Bold No.1 Roman (see: 251)
 composition matrices: UA.3 = 8-10pt

 171: Egyptian Bold (see: 171 Egyptian) (cancelled in 1967)
 330: Egyptian Bold (synonym: 330 Egyptian) (cancelled in 1967)
 composition matrices: UA.3 = 6D

 282: Egyptian Bold Condensed Roman (see: 251) (synonyms: Egyptian Heavy and Heavy Egyptian composition matrices: UA.313 = 6D

 251: Egyptian Condensed Roman
 composition matrices: UA.63 = 6.5pt

 112: Egyptian Condensed (cancelled in 1967)
 composition matrices: UA.2 = 9pt

 464: Egyptian Condensed (cancelled in 1967)
 composition matrices: UA.130 = 6D-10D
{| style="margin-left:40px;"
|-
|size:||6D op 7pE||7D op 8pE||8D op 9pE||9D op 10pE||10D op 11pE
|-
|set:||6.75||7.75||8.5||9.5||10.75
|-
|line:||M.1206||M.1246||M.1278||M.1301||M.1335
|}
 _72: Egyptian Extended Roman
 composition matrices: UA.3 = 5-13pt

 465: Egyptian Extended (bij bombardement vernietigd)
 282: Egyptian Heavy Roman (see: 282 Egyptian Bold Condensed)
Ehrhardt
 453: Ehrhardt Roman/italic
 composition matrices: UA.397 = 6-14pt

 display matrices:

 563: Ehrhardt (cancelled in 1974)
 573: Ehrhardt Semi-Bold Roman/italic
 composition matrices: UA.430 = 6-14pt

 display matrices:

EllingtonElite Typewriter 235: Elite Typewriter (see: Typewriter)
 composition matrices: UA.28 = 12pt

Elsevir
 _19: Elsevir Roman/italic
 UA.1 6pt - 12 ptThe Monotype Corporation Ltd. specimen blade 10-76

 Electronic Reading Founts E-13B CMC7 407-1 OCR-BEmerson 320: Emerson Roman/italic
 composition matrices: UA.390 = 8-14pt

 display matrices:

 400: Emerson (cancelled in 1967)
 479: Emerson (destroyed in a bombardment)
 Emery 452: Emery (cancelled in 1965)
 Engravers Titling 146: Engraver's Titling (see: 146 Engravers' Titling)
 146: Engravers' Titling Roman
 composition matrices: UA.18 = 6pt, capitals in 4 sizes, that can be combined.

 147: Engravers' Titling (see: Engravers' Bold Titling)
 147: Engravers' Titling Bold (see: Engravers' Bold Titling)
 Engravers Bold titling 147: Engravers Bold Titling Roman
 composition matrices: UA.18 = 6 and 12pt in 4 sizes that can be combined.

 display matrices: 24 pt in 5 sizes

F
 Fabritius 586: Fabritius RomanFalstaff 323: Falstaff Roman/italic
 composition matrices: UA.347 = 6D-12D

 display matrices:

 Felix Titling 
 399: Felix Titling Roman
 display matrices:

 Fanfare Bold
 514: Fanfare Bold Condensed Italic Titling italic (destroyed in a bombardment)
 516: Fanfare Bold Condensed Italic Titling No.2 italic
 Festival Titling
 554: Festival Titling italic
 display matrices:

 Figaro
 536: Figaro Roman
 display matrices:

 626: Figaro Bold (cancelled in 1967)
^ Fleet Titling
 632: Fleet Titling Roman
 display matrices:

 Floriated capitals
 431: Floriated capitals
 display matrices:

 Fontana
 403: Fontana Roman/italic
 composition matrices: UA.464 = 8pt-14pt

 large composition matrices:

 437: Fontana bible face Roman/italic
 composition matrices: UA.464 = 4.5pt-6pt

 443: Fontana Titling (destroyed in a bombardment)
 Forte
 614: Forte
 display matrices:

 Fournier
 185: Fournier Roman/italic
 composition matrices: UA.59 = 8pt-13.5pt

 large composition matrices: UA. 446

 185: Fournier Old Face (see: Fournier)
 285: Fournier Old Face (Shortened Caps) (see: Fournier Shortened Capitals)
 285: Fournier Shortened Capitals Roman/italic (see also: Fournier 185)
 composition matrices: UA.59 = 10pt-13.5pt, abridged capitals, for use in conjunction with the lowercase characters of Fournier 185

 French Face Extended
 _76: French Face Extended (cancelled in 1967)
 composition matrices: UA.1 = 7D-10pt

 French Modern
 111: French Modern (cancelled in 1967)
 composition matrices: UA.1 = 6D-10pt

 French Old Style
 _68: French Old Style Roman/italic
 composition matrices: UA.1 = 6.5pt-13pt
 oid specimen blades show size 7pt and 8pt, later versions: 6.5pt and 7.5pt, set and lining stay the same.

 109: French Old Style Roman/italic (synonym: French Old Stype no. 2) (cancelled in 1967)
 composition matrices: UA.1 = 6.5pt-11pt

 148: French Old Style No.3 (cancelled in 1967
 composition matrices: UA.1 = 6.5pt

 _69: French Old Style Bold Roman/italic
 composition matrices: UA.1 = 7pt-13pt

 _69: French Old Style (Half-Fat) (see: French Old Style Bold)
 French Round Face
 _44: French Round Face Roman/italic
 composition matrices: UA.1 = 6.5pt-13pt

 Fredericus Antiqus
 314: Fredericus Antiqus Roman/italic
 composition matrices: UA.1 = 6.5pt-13pt

 Futura Buchschrift
 596: Futura Buchschrift (cancelled in 1960)

G
 Gallia (Sorts)
 a313: Gallia (Sorts) (cancelled voor 1966)
Garamond
 156: Garamond Roman/italic
 Swash and ligatures for 156
 The italic which was designed for this series was found by customers to be much too extreme. Eventually it was decided to design a more modest italic. That was:  ' Series 174  '. The extra luxury italic "swash"-capitals continued to be maintained. In old die cases the italic matrices with 156 appearing on them are occasionally to be found, and they are quite popular for present users of Monotype machines.
 composition matrices: UA.37 = 6-12pt,  UA.99 = 14pt

 large composition: Roman = UA.114 italic = UA.115
14pt (14D) Roman/italic, 16pt (16D) Roman, 18pt (18D) Roman/italic, 24pt (24D) Roman/italic

 display matrices:

 201: Garamond bold Roman/italic
 composition matrices: 6-12pt: Roman = UA.61, italic = UA.315, 14pt = UA.342

 large composition: UA.154
18pt (18D) Roman/italic, 24pt (24D) Roman/italic

 display matrices:

 174: Garamond Italic No.2 italic (the Roman was cancelled before 1966)
 composition matrices: UA.42 = 6-12pt,  UA.140 = 14pt

 large composition: UA.140
14pt (14D) Roman/italic, 18pt (18D) Roman/italic, 24pt (24D) Roman/italic

 display matrices:

 201: Garamond Heavy (see: 201 Garamond Bold)
 Am. 548: Garamond Bold
 Am. 5481: Garamond Bold Italic
 Am. 648E: American Garamond (Roman)
 Am. 649G: American Garamond Italic
 Garamont (Goudy)
 Am. 248: Garamont (Goudy) Roman
 Am. 2481: Garamont Italic (Goudy) italic
 Gill
 275: Gill Bold Sans-Serif (see: 275 Gill Sans Bold)
 430: Gill Face (destroyed in a bombardment)
 442: Gill Ultra Bold (see: 442 Gill Sans Ultra Bold)
 433: Gill Moiree Shadow (destroyed in a bombardment)
 Gill Sans
 262: Gill Sans Roman/italic
 composition matrices: Roman: UA.82, italic: UA.311 = 5-14pt (S.H. = short descenders)

 large composition: UA.383, Roman 18pt

 display matrices:

 349: Gill Sans No.2 Roman/italic
 composition matrices: Roman: UA.345 = 5pt

 275: Gill Sans Bold Roman/italic
 composition matrices: Roman: UA.93 = 5-14pt, italic: UA.302 = 5.5-14pt (S.H. = short descenders)

 large composition: UA.383, Roman 18pt

 display matrices:

 350: Gill Sans Bold Roman (see: 350 Gill Sans 349)
 composition matrices: Roman: UA.346 = 5pt

 575: Gill Sans Bold (cancelled in 1967)
 343: Gill Sans Bold Condensed Roman
 composition matrices: Roman: UA.93 = 5-14pt, italic: UA.302 = 5.5-14pt (S.H. = short descenders)

 display matrices:

 373: Gill Sans Bold Condensed Titling No.1 Roman
 display matrices:

 525: Gill Sans Bold Condensed Titling Roman
 display matrices:

 468: Gill Sans Bold Extra Condensed Eoman
 display matrices:

 _L8: Gill Sans Bold Timetable Roman
 317: Gill Sans Bold Titling Roman
 display matrices:

 233: Gill Sans Cameo Roman
 display matrices:

 299: Gill Sans Cameo Ruled Roman
 display matrices:

 485: Gill Sans Condensed Roman
 composition matrices: Roman: UA.499 = 10-12pt

 display matrices:

 321: Gill Sans Extra Bold Roman
 composition matrices: UA.336 = 6D-12pt

 display matrices:

 526: Gill Sans Extra Bold Titling Roman
 display matrices:

 526: Gill Sans Extra Heavy Titling (see: 526 Gill Sans Extra Bold Titling)
 362: Gill Sans Light Roman/italic
 composition matrices: Roman: UA.82 = 4.5-14pt, italic: UA.311 = 5-14pt

 display matrices:

 662: Gill Sans Light No.2 Roman (synonym: Gill Sans Light, see also: Gill Sans 349)
 composition matrices: Roman: UA.345 = 5pt

 353: Gill Sans Poster Roman
 display matrices:

 406: Gill Sans Shadow No.1 Roman
 display matrices:

 408: Gill Sans Shadow No.2 Roman
 display matrices:

 338: Gill Sans Shadow No.3 Roman
 display matrices:

 290: Gill Sans Shadow Line Roman
 display matrices:

 304: Gill Sans Shadow Titling Roman
 display matrices:

 231: Gill Sans Titling Roman
 composition matrices: UA.84 = 6pt in 4 sizes, 12pt

 display matrices:

 262: Gill Sans-Serif (see: 262 Gill Sans)
 349: Gill Sans-Serif (see: 349 Gill Sans)
 353: Gill Sans-Serif (see: 353 Gill Sans Poster)
 275: Gill Sans-Serif Bold (see: 275 Gill Sans Bold)
 350: Gill Sans-Serif Bold (see: 350 Gill Sans Bold)
 343: Gill Sans-Serif Bold Condensed (see: 343 Gill Sans Bold Condensed)
 468: Gill Sans-Serif Bold Extra Condensed (see: 465 Gill Sans Bold Extra Condensed)
 233: Gill Sans-Serif Cameo (see: 233 Gill Sans Cameo)
 299: Gill Sans-Serif Cameo Ruled (see: 299 Gill Sans Cameo Ruled)
 373: Gill Sans-Serif Extra Bold Titling (see: 373 Gill Sans Bold Condensed Titling)
 321: Gill Sans-Serif Extra Heavy (see: 321 Gill Sans Extra Bold)
 485: Gill Sans-Serif Medium Condensed (see: 485 Gill Sans Condensed)
 362: Gill Sans-Serif Light (see: 362 Gill Sans Light)
 304: Gill Sans-Serif Shadow (see: 304 Gill Sans Shadow Titling)
 406: Gill Sans-Serif Shadow No.1 (see: 406 Gill Sans Shadow No.1)
 408: Gill Sans-Serif Shadow No.2 (see: 408 Gill Sans Shadow No.2)
 290: Gill Sans-Serif Shadowline (see: 290 Gill Sans Shadow Line)
 231: Gill Sans-Serif Titling (see: 231 Gill Sans Titling)
 317: Gill Sans-Serif Titling (see: 317 Gill Sans Bold Titling)
 338: Gill Sans-Serif Two Colour (see: 338 Gill Sans Shadow No.3)
 442: Gill Sans-Serif Ultra Bold (see: 442 Gill Sans Ultra Bold)
 442: Gill Sans Ultra Bold Roman
 display matrices:

 Alternative characters for 262, 275, 362
 Gloucester
 103: Gloucester Bold Roman/italic
 composition matrices: UA.5 = 6-13.5pt,

 display matrices:

 198: Gloucester Bold Condensed Roman
 composition matrices: UA.60 = 6-12pt,

 display matrices:

 243: Gloucester Bold Extended Roman
 composition matrices: UA.75 = 6-12pt,

 display matrices:

 395: Gloucester Bold Extra Condensed Roman
 display matrices: 14-72pt

 160: Gloucester Bold Italic 
 composition matrices: UA.3 = 6-12pt,

 396: Gloucester Extra Condensed Roman
 display matrices: 14-72pt

 _99: Gloucester Old Style Roman/italic
 composition matrices: UA.4 = 6-13.5pt,

 large composition: 18pt (18D) UA.116, Roman/italic, 24pt (24D) UA.117, Roman/italic

 display matrices:

Gothic (collective name for sans serif typefaces)
 __4: Gothic (synonym: Grotesque Condensed) (cancelled in 1967)
 composition matrices UA.1B 6pt - 12pt

 Goudy
 269: Goudy Bold Roman/italic
 composition matrices: UA.88 = 6-14pt,

 display matrices:

 441: Goudy Bold Roman/italic
 composition matrices: UA.382 = 6-12pt,

 268: Goudy Cataloque Roman/italic
 composition matrices: UA.83 = 6-14pt,

 display matrices:

 364: Goudy Cataloque Roman/italic
 composition matrices: UA.1 = 5-6pt, UA.419 = 7pt-7.75pt,

 214: Goudy Extra Bold Roman/italic
 composition matrices: UA.88 = 6-14pt,

 display matrices:

 249: Goudy Modern Roman/italic
 composition matrices: UA.87 = 10-12pt,

 display matrices:

 291: Goudy Old Style Roman/italic
 composition matrices: UA.312 = 6-14pt, long descenders available, Swash capitals in: 42, 60, 72pt

 display matrices:

 292: Goudy Text (gotisch schrift)
 composition matrices: UA.339 = 9-12pt, can be combined with 293 Lombardic Capitals

 display matrices:

 439: Goudy Titling Roman
 Gravura
 533: Gravura Roman (cancelled in 1965)
 composition matrices: UA.1 = 12pt

 Grock
 388: Grock Roman
 display matrices:

 Grosvenor Script
 493: Grosvenor Script italic
 display matrices:

 Grotesque (collective name for sans serif typefaces)
 _11: Grotesque (see: 11 Grotesque Bold Condensed)
 _33: Grotesque (see: 33 Grotesque Condensed)
 _51: Grotesque Roman/italic
 composition matrices: UA.2 = 6-12pt, UA.124 = 14pt-18pt, UA.125= 24pt

 large composition:

 display matrices:

 126: Grotesque (see: 126 Grotesque Light No.1)
 215: Grotesque Roman/italic (synonym: Grotesque No. 1)
 composition matrices: 5pt = roman UA.421 and intslic UA.429, 6.5pt-13pt = roman UA.65 and italic UA.401

 display matrices:

 216: Grotesque (see: 216 Grotesque Bold)
 274: Grotesque (see: 274 Grotesque Light Condensed)
 389: Grotesque No.2 (see: 389 Grotesque Light)
 212: Grotesque Roman (cancelled in 1964)
 composition matrices: UA.62 = 6.5pt

 _73: Grotesque Bold No.3 Roman
 composition matrices: UA.3 = 6-13pt

 _97: Grotesque Bold Roman (in red: withdrawn around 197(?) )
 composition matrices: UA.2 = 7.7pt

 216: Grotesque Bold No.2 Roman/italic combines with Series No. 215 Grotesque
 composition matrices: 6.5pt-13pt = UA.66

 display matrices:

 680: Grotesque Bold Roman (see: Bell Gothic 619)
 composition matrices UA.502 6pt

 _11: Grotesque Bold Condensed (cancelled in 1967)
 composition matrices: UA-2, 6pt & 9pt (synonym: Grotesque)
 
 _15: Grotesque Bold Condensed No.2 Roman/italic (synonym: series 15 Sans Serif)
 composition matrices Roman: UA.2 = 6pt - 12pt
 6pt (6D) with short descenders: 6.5 set line .1225

 display matrices:

 365: Grotesque Bold Condensed (synonym: 365 Heavy Narrow Gothic) (cancelled in 1967)
 composition matrices UA.333 = 10pt - 12pt

 _81: Grotesque Bold Condensed Roman
 composition matrices: UA.2 = 10pt

 166: Grotesque Bold Condensed No.4 (synonym: 166 Grotesque Bold Condensed Titling)
 composition matrices: UA.403 = 12pt, UA.121 = 14pt

 large composition:

 display matrices:

 166: Grotesque Bold Condensed Titling Roman (see: 166 Grotesque Bold Condensed No.4)
 527: Grotesque Bold Condensed Titling Roman
 display matrices:

 150: Grotesque Bold Extended No.1 Roman/italic
 composition matrices: 6pt-12pt, 7pt and 9pt only italic

 large composition:

 display matrices:

 168: Grotesque Bold Extended (cancelled in 1967)
 524: Grotesque Bold Titling Roman
 display matrices:

 _33: Grotesque Condensed No.2 Roman
 composition matrices: UA.2 = 6pt-13.5pt

 large composition, UA.395 = 22pt :

 display matrices:

 318: Grotesque Condensed Roman
 composition matrices: UA.388 = 5D, 6pt, UA.300 = 6D-13pt

 display matrices:

 383: Grotesque Condensed No.4 Roman
 composition matrices: UA.341 = 5D-12D

 display matrices:

 __4: Grotesque Condensed (see: Gothic Series No.4)
 383: Grotesque Condensed Heavy (see: 383 Grotesque Condensed)
 523: Grotesque Condensed Titling Roman
 display matrices:

 215: Grotesque Half Fat (see: 215 Grotesque No.1)
 126: Grotesque Light No.1 Roman/italic
 composition matrices: UA.420/UA.431 = 5pt-5.5pt, UA.64/UA.396 = 6.5pt-13pt

 display matrices:

 389: Grotesque Light (synonym: 389 Grotesque No. 2) (cancelled in 1967)
 composition matrices: UA.2 = 8pt-12pt

 274: Grotesque Light Condensed No.2 Roman
 composition matrices: UA.427 =5D, UA.94 = 6D-13pt

 204: Grotesque Light Condensed (synonym: 204 Light face Gothic) (cancelled in 1967)
 composition matrices: UA.58 = 12pt

 display matrices:

 405: Grotesque Light Condensed (cancelled in 1967)
 405: Grotesque Narrow (see: 405 Grotesque Light Condensed)
 177: Grotesque Newspaper Smalls (see: 177 Newspaper Small Ads)
 216: Grotesque ¾ Fat (see: 216 Grotesque Bold No.1)
 502: Grotesque Timetable (cancelled in 1967)
 524: Grotesque Titling (see: 524 Grotesque Bold Titling)
 Gwendolin
 208: Gwendolin (cancelled in 1967)
 Gustavus
 484: Gustavus Bold (cancelled in 1965)
 497: Gustavus Light (cancelled in 1965)

H
 Haarlemmer
 531: Haarlemmer Roman (withdrawn in 1967) design: Jan van Krimpen
 composition matrices: UA.408 = 14D

 Half Fat Modern Mediaeval
 _52: Half Fat Modern Mediaeval Roman (synonym: 52 Schurmann Antiqua Halbfette) (withdrawn in 196(?) )
 composition matrices: UA.5

 Headline bold 
 595: Headline Bold Roman/italic
 composition matrices: UA.443 = 6-14pt

 display matrices:

 Heavy
 223: Heavy Antique (see: Devonshire Bold)
 282: Heavy Egyptian (see: 282 Egyptian Bold Condensed) (synonym Egyptian Heavy)
 365: Heavy Narrow Gothic (see: 365 Grotesque Bold Condensed) (cancelled in 1967)
 435: Heavy Shadow French (cancelled in ??)
 337: Heavy Small Caps (cancelled in 1974)
 Helvetica
 765: Helvetica Roman/italic
 combines with 766 Helvetica Medium, equivalent with Stempel's Helvetica halbfett, and Linotype Helvetica Bold
 composition matrices: UA.508 = 6D-12D

 766: Helvetica Medium Roman/italic
 composition matrices: UA.508 = 6D-12D
 
 Horley Old Style
 261: Horley Old Face Heavy (see: 261 Horley Old Style Bold)
 188: Horley Old Style (replaced by  199, cancelled in 1965)
 199: Horley Old Style Roman/italic
 composition matrices: UA.56 = 6-13pt,  UA.362 = 14pt

 large composition: Roman = UA.367

 display matrices:

 261: Horley Old Style Bold Roman/italic
 composition matrices: UA.80 = 6-13pt

 display matrices:

 923: Hungry Dutch, roman
composition matrices, 12pt, no italic available
Design: Russell Maret, a revival of a typeface cut in 1686 by Peter van Walpengen for Bishop John Fell of Oxford. After 50 years this was in 2020 the first design for a font to cast in composition.

I
 Imprint
 101: Imprint Roman/italic
 combines with series 310 or 410
 composition matrices: UA.4 = 6-12pt, UA.4a = 13.5pt

 large composition:

 display matrices:

 310: Imprint Bold Roman/italic
 combines with series 101
 composition matrices: UA.98 = 6pt-13.5pt

 410: Imprint Bold No.2 Roman/italic
 combines with series 101
 composition matrices: 6-13.5pt

 310: Imprint Heavy No.1 (see: 310 Imprint Bold)
 410: Imprint Heavy No.2 (see: 410 Imprint Bold)
 101: Imprint Old Face (see: 101 Imprint)
 190: Imprint Shadow Roman/italic
display matrices

 Indicateur
 462: Indicateur (cancelled in 1967)
 Inflex Bold 
 366: Inflex Bold Roman
 composition matrices: UA.344 = 5pt-9pt, combines with: Series No. 342 Ionic

 Inflex Timetable
 503: Inflex Timetable (see: Bold Face)
 Ionic
 __6: Ionic (see: 6 Modern no.4) (cancelled in 1967)
 265: Ionic No.1 Roman/italic (cancelled in 1967)
 composition matrices: UA.321 = 6pt-6.5pt

 342: Ionic No.2 Roman/italic (see also: 562 Ionic 2-line
 composition matrices: UA.317 = 5pt-9pt

 184: Ionic No.3 Roman (synonym : 184 Egyptian) (cancelled in 1967)
 composition matrices: UA.51 = 6pt

 153: Ionic No.4 Roman (cancelled in 1967)
 composition matrices: UA.1 = 8pt

 416: Ionic No.5 Roman/italic (cancelled in 1967)
 composition matrices: UA.1 = 7D-8D

 451: Ionic No.6 Roman/italic (cancelled in 1967)
 composition matrices: UA.380 = 6pt-7pt

 476: Ionic (destroyed in a bombardment)
 562: Ionic Two-line Roman only 10 pt high capitals, numbers and signs (see also: 342 Ionic)
 composition matrices: UA.317(?) = 5pt,
 In a die case combined with series 342-5pt this produces 10pt large initials, to produce advertisements. All can be done in one machine-run.

 Iroquois Condensed
 _23: Iroquois Condensed Roman (cancelled in 1964)
 UA.2, 8pt, 10pt, 12 pt

 Italian Old Style 
 108: Italian Old Style Roman/italic
 composition matrices: UA.4 = 6pt-13pt

 display matrices:

 149: Italian Old Style Bold Roman
 composition matrices: UA.5 = 6pt-13pt

 display matrices:

 149: Italian Old Style Display (see: 149 Italian Bold Style Bold & Veronese (typeface))
 Italic Display
 _54: Italic Display (see: 54 Modern Bold Italic)

J
 Jacno
 579: Jacno (experimental)
 Janson
 646: Janson (cancelled in 1972)
 Am. 401 Janson Roman
 Am. 4011 Janson italic
 Jenson
 Am. 58 Jenson Old Style
 Am. 258 Jenson Condensed
Joanna
 478: Joanna Roman/italic
 composition matrices: UA.449 = 8pt-14pt

 display matrices:

 Jocunda
 369: Jocunda Roman only capitals, numbers and signs (cancelled in 1967)
 display matrices:

K
 Kaatskill
 311: Kaatskill (cancelled in 1967)
 Kennerley
 Am:
 Kino
 305: Kino Roman
 display matrices:

 Klang
 593: Klang italic
 display matrices:

L
 Lamp
 490: Lamp (cancelled)
 Latin Antique
 __9: Latin Antique Roman
 composition matrices: UA-2 (6-13pt) (synonym: Latin Antique)
 
 _60: Latin Antique Roman (synonym: 60 Latin Antique No.2
 composition matrices: UA.2 = 8-12pt

 _78: Latin Antique Roman
 composition matrices: UA.2 = 6-13pt

 _84: Latin Antique (cancelled) (synonym: 84 Latin Antique no. 4)
 composition matrices: UA.2 = 6-12pt

 419: Latin Condensed Roman
 display matrices:

 164: Latin Wide (cancelled in 1967)
 composition matrices: UA.19 = 8pt

 Laudian Old Style
 450: Laudian Old Style Roman/italic
 composition matrices: UA.1 = 5.5pt-7.75pt

 454: Laudian Old Style (destroyed by bombs)
 Lectern Missal
 538: Lectern Missal Roman (see: Missal 393)
 Leysbourne
 348: Leysbourne (cancelled in 1965)
 12 pt 10.5 set line.1325 UA.359
 Light
 505: Light Extra Condensed (see: 505 Placard light Extra Condensed)
 204: Light Face Gothic (see: 204 Grotesque Light Condensed)
 113: Light Face Plantin (see: 113 Plantin Light)
 522: Light Placard Titling (see: 522 Placard Condensed Titling)
 475: Light Script (see: 475 Script Light)
 Littleworth
 284: Littleworth (cancelled in 1967)
 UA.=317, composition: 12pt = 10.5 set line.1336, 16pt display matrices line.1557
 Lombardic Capitals
 293: Lombardic Capitals (see: 292 Goudy Text 292)
 L.P.T.B. Titling
 517: L.P.T.B. Titling (cancelled in 1965)
 Lutetia, this early design of Jan van Krimpen was modified for Monotype. Jan van Krimpen had given his permission to change his design for hand composing of Lettergieterij Amsterdam to edit it for machine composition. Later he had to admit that the result was very good. But he added immediately that "if" he had known this in advance ...  he never would have agreed ... to get as close as possible to the original design to be able to stay, it was necessary to make another unit-arrangement for each size. Consequently, it was a very expensive for the printer customers, since each size with another wedge had to be poured. Also on the keyboard keybanks for each size was another requirement, and extra wedges also had to be purchased.
 255: Lutetia Roman/italic
 composition matrices Unit arrangements different for each size

 display matrices:

M
 Mardersteig
 347: Mardersteig
Never produced, only one proof-set was made for Giovanni Mardersteig himself. The matrices were lost.
 Matura
 496: Matura script
 display matrices:

 Matura scriptorial Capitals 
 528: Matura scriptorial Capitals (combines with 496 Matura)
 display matrices:

 Mediaeval
 125: Mediaeval Roman (cancelled in 1965)
 134: Mediaeval Roman (cancelled in 1965)
 136: Mediaeval Roman (cancelled in 1965)
 _88: Mediaeval Modern (see: 88 Modern Mediaeval)
 _52: Mediaeval Modern Half-Fat (see: 52 Half-Fat Modern Mediaeval) (synonyms: 52 Schurmann Antiqua Halbfette, Half-Fat Modern Mediaeval) (cancelled in 196?)
 _67: Mediaeval Old Style (see: 67 Old Style)
 Menhart
 397: Menhart Roman/italic
 composition matrices: UA.378 = 10D-14

 display matrices:

 Mercurius Bold Script
 583: Mercurius Bold Script
 display matrices:

 Missal
 336: Missal
 393: Missal Roman
 448: Missal No.3
 459: Missal No.4
 Modern
 __1: Modern No.1 Roman/italic
 1901,  after a design of Miller & Richards
 composition matrices: UA-1 (6-12pt), UA-1a(14pt),

 _80: Modern No.2 (cancelled in 1967)
190?, composition matrices: UA-1,

 189: Modern No.3 Roman/italic
 190?, composition matrices: UA-1,

 __6: Modern No.4 (cancelled in 1967) (synonym: Ionic)
 190?, composition matrices: UA-1,
 
 _95: Modern No.5 Roman/italic (cancelled in 1967)
 composition matrices: UA-1 = 11pt

 250: Modern No.6 Roman (synonym: 250 Modern Condensed no.5)
 composition matrices: UA.92 = 6.5pt UA=418 = 7D

 422: Modern No.7 Roman/italic (cancelled in 1965)
 composition matrices: UA.376 = 12 pt

 471: Modern No.8 Roman (cancelled in 1967)
 composition matrices: UA.1  8D-10D

 183: Modern Roman (synonym: 183 Modern no. 6) (cancelled in 1967)
 display matrices,

 211: Modern Roman (see: 211 Century no.1)
 257: Modern (synonym: 257 Modern Wide)
 composition matrices: UA.1

 444: Modern (cancelled in 1936)
 570: Modern Bold Roman, combines with: Modern Series No. 7
composition matrices: UA.2,

 _54: Modern Bold Italic italic (synonym: 54 Italic-Display)
composition matrices: UA.3 = 6-12pt

 display matrices:

 263: Modern Cancellation Fount Roman (see: 263 Modern Extended 17)
 _13: Modern Condensed No.1 Roman/italic
 composition matrices UA.1 = 6pt

 _14: Modern Condensed No.2 Roman/italic
 composition matrices: UA.1 = 7 pt

 _39: Modern Condensed No.3 Roman/italic
composition matrices: UA.1,

 _79: Modern Condensed No.4 Roman/italic (cancelled in 1965)
 composition matrices: UA.1 = 11pt

 250: Modern Condensed No.5 Roman
 composition matrices: UA.92 = 6.5pt, UA.418 = 7D

 __7: Modern Extended No.1 Roman/italic,
 1902, some bit wider version of Modern no.1
 composition matrices: UA.1 = 6pt-12pt

 _77: Modern Extended No.2 Roman/italic (cancelled in 1967)
 composition matrices, UA1 = 9pt-11pt

 447: Modern Extended No.3 (cancelled in 1965)
 composition matrices, UA1 = 8D-9D

 237: Modern French
 247: Modern French (cancelled in 1965)
 _88: Modern Mediaeval (cancelled in 1964)
 _52: Modern Mediaeval (Half-Fat) (see: 52 Half-Fat Modern Mediaeval) (synonyms: 52 Schurmann Antiqua Halbfette, Half-Fat Modern Mediaeval) (cancelled in 196?)
 500: Modern Timetable (cancelled in 1967)
 179: Modern Titling Roman/italic (synonyms: 179 Titling 179, Titling Italic)
 composition matrices: UA.1 = UA.8-12pt

 _16: Modern Wide No.1 Roman/italic
 composition matrices: UA.1 = 5pt

 _18: Modern Wide No.2 Roman/italic (synonym: Modern Wide)
 composition matrices: UA.1 = 6pt

 _25: Modern Wide No.3 Roman/italic (synonym: Modern Wide, also referred to as: Romano)
 composition matrices UA.2 = 6pt - 12pt

 _26: Modern Wide No.4 Roman/italic (synonym: Modern Wide)
 composition matrices: UA.1 = 4.5pt-5pt

 _30: Modern Wide No.5 Roman/italic (synonym: Modern Wide)
 composition matrices: UA.1 = 7pt-8pt

 _75: Modern Wide No.6 (synonym: 75 Modern Wide) (cancelled in 1967)
 composition matrices: UA.1 = 7Dt

 257: Modern Wide No.7 (cancelled in 1967)
 composition matrices: UA.1 = 10pt-11pt

 Modernistic
 a297: Modernistic (Sorts) (cancelled vóór 1966)
 Morrison Face
 537: Morrison Face (cancelled in 1964)
 Monoline Script
 351: Monoline Script
 Musical signs
 210: Musical signs
 382: Musical signs

N
 Narrow
 294: Narrow Bembo Italic (see: 294 Bembo Condensed Italic)
 166: Narrow Gothic (see: 166 Grotesque Bold Condensed Titling)
 527: Narrow Gothic Titling (see: 527 Grotesque Bold Condensed Titling)
 405: Narrow Grotesque (see: 405 Grotesque Light Condensed)
 Nastaliq
 402: Nastaliq (cancelled)
 Neo Didot
 _27: Neo Didot Roman/italic
 composition matrices: UA.1 = 6.5-13pt

 _65: Neo Didot Roman/italic
 composition matrices: UA.1 = 6.5-13pt

 New Clarendon
 617: New Clarendon Roman/italic combines with: 618 New Clarendon Bold
 composition matrices: UA.481 = 6-14pt

 display matrices:

 618: New Clarendon Bold Roman/italic
 composition matrices: UA.481 = 6-14pt

 display matrices:

 New Emerald Bible
 610: New Emerald Bible
 New Face
 606: New Face (cancelled in 1964)
 607: New Face Bold (cancelled in 1964)
 615: New Grotesque (cancelled in 1974) (apart from "A")
 616: New Grotesque Bold (cancelled in 1974) (apart from "A")
 666: New Grotesque Light (cancelled in 1967) (apart from "A")
 News Advertisements
 229: News Advertisements (see: Newspaper Small Ads)
 Newspaper Small Ads
 177: Newspaper Small Ads (cancelled in 1965)
 229: Newspaper Small Ads (cancelled in 1965)
 Newspaper Smalls
 115: Newspaper Smalls Roman (cancelled vóór 1966)
 Available matrices: capitals, small capitals and lower case plus double large capitals and numbers.
 These four alphabets could be cast in one machine-run, the double capitals overhanging at the bottom, relying on the "high-white" of neighbouring character. These high-blanks were cast from a blank matrix and adapted exactly under the overhanging characters.
 composition matrices: UA.30 = 5.5-7pt

 163: Newspaper Smalls (cancelled in 1967)
 193: Newspaper Smalls (cancelled in 1965)
 333: Newspaper Smalls (The Times) (see: Times Newspaper Smalls)
 335: Newspaper Smalls (The Times) (see: Times Newspaper Smalls)

O
 Octavian
 603 : Octavian Roman/italic
 Design: about 1960 by Will Carter and David Kindersley. Used the first time in June 1961 for a text taken from the introduction to Stanley Morison's "The Typographic Book", intended for the members of the "Double Crown Club".
 composition matrices: UA.485 = 14pt

 Old English text
 456: Old English text frakture typeface
 composition matrices: UA.318 = 8-12pt

 display matrices:

 356: Old English Text frakture typeface (cancelled in 1967)
 composition matrices: UA.318 = 8-12pt

 456: Old English Text Light (see: 456 Old English Text)
 Old Face
 _43: Old Face (see: _43 Scotch Roman No.3)
 _46: Old Face (see: _46 Scotch Roman No.1)
 137: Old Face (see: 137 Scotch Roman No.2)
 154: Old Face (see: 154 Chiswell Old Face)
 240: Old Face (cancelled in 1964)
 composition matrices: UA.385 = 9pt

 159: Old Face Heavy (see: 159 Old Style Bold No.2)
 _20: Old Face (Special) (cancelled in 1967)
 UA.6, 6.5pt - 12 pt

 _45: Old Face Standard (cancelled in 1967)
 Old Style
 __2: Old Style No.2 Roman/italic
 UA.1: 6 tot 12 punt, UA.1a: 14pt

 151: Old Style No.4 Roman/italic
 composition matrices: UA.20 = 6-11pt, UA.20a = 12pt, UA.52 = 14pt

 large composition: Roman = UA.133 italic = UA.358
18pt (18D) Roman/italic, 24Pt (24D) Roman

 display matrices:

 _67: Old Style Roman/italic (cancelled in 1967)
 UA.1 = 9-12pt

 104: Old Style Roman/italic(cancelled in 1964)
 UA.1 =  11pt

 __3: Old Style Antique (see: __3 Antique Old Style)
 124: Old Style Antique (see: 124 Antique Old Style)
 161: Old Style Antique (see: 161 Antique Old Style)
 232: Old Style Antique Italic (cancelled in 1965)
 _53: Old Style Bold No.1 Roman/italic
 composition matrices: UA.3,3a: 53-12 italic, 53-14 & 18 : UA 100, 53-24: UA 101, italic: UA 76
 Large composition matrices only available in roman.

Display-matrijzen:

 159: Old Style Bold No.2 Roman
 composition matrices: UA.32 = 8-12pt, UA.112 = 14pt

 large composition: UA.112

 display matrices:

 544: Old Style Bold No.5 Roman
 composition matrices: UA.2 = 6-12pt

 253: Old Style Bold (synonym: 253 Bold Face No.2) (cancelled in 1967)
 composition matrices: UA.3 = 8-9pt

 245: Old Style Bold Italic italic (synonym: 245 Bold Face Italic No.2) (cancelled in 1967)
 composition matrices: UA.76 = 8-12pt

 176: Old Style Bold Outline Roman
 composition matrices: UA.100 = 12pt

 large composition: UA.100

 display matrices:

 __8: Old Style Condensed Roman/italic (cancelled in 1967)
 UA.1, = one size only: 10pt (9D) = 9 set, line.1295

 _50: Old Style Condensed (cancelled in 1967)
 composition matrices: UA.1 = 8-10pt

 _55: Old Style Italic Display (see: 55 Gloucester Bold Italic)
 122: Old Style (Prumyslava) Roman
Onyx
 591: Onyx Roman
 Onyx was created in 1937 and was inspired by the Stephanie typeface created by Bauer Type Foundry in 1870.
 display matrices:

 Am 404): Onyx Roman
 Opus
 652: Opus (cancelled in 1966)
 Othello
 246: Othello Roman capitals
 composition matrices: UA.85 = 10pt-12

 display matrices:

 248: Othello Shadow (cancelled in 1967)
 Outline
 176: Outline (see: 176 Old Style Bold Outline)

P
 Palace script
 429: Palace Script italic
 Overhanging character that can only be cast with special moulds.
 display matrices:

 Pastonchi
 206: Pastonchi Roman/italic
 composition matrices: UA.69 = 9-13 pt, UA.175 = 14D.

 display matrices:

 Pegasus
 508: Pegasus Roman
 display matrices:

 Pepita
 613: Petita script
display matrices

 Perpetua
 239: Perpetua Roman/italic
 introduction: 1930, design: Eric Gill,
 composition matrices UA.96 = 5.5pt - 18pt

 large-composition matrices: 18pt(18D) 16.5 set line T.1635
 display matrices:

 316: Perpetua No.3 (cancelled in 1967)
 registered design No. 751804,
 composition matrices: UA.96 = 9pt

 386: Perpetua No.2 (cancelled in 1967)
 composition matrices: UA.96 = 14pt

 461: Perpetua Bold Roman/italic
 composition matrices UA.379 = 6pt - 14pt

 display matrices:

 200: Perpetua Bold Titling Roman
 composition matrices: UA. 145 : 12pt(12D) = 11.25 set line.1753
 display matrices:

 480: Perpetua Light Titling Roman
 display matrices:

 561: Perpetua Semi-Bold (cancelled in 1963)
 258: Perpetua Titling Roman
 composition matrices: UA. 97 = 10pt - 12pt

 display matrices:

 543: Perpetua Titling (cancelled in 1967)
 480: Perpetua Titling Light Face (see: 480 Perpetua Light Titling)
 Pierre Didot
 411: Pierre Didot (cancelled in 1965)
 composition matrices: UA.375 = 9pt

 Pitman i.t.a.
 453: Pitman's i.t.a. (see: Ehrhardt 453)
 573: Pitman's i.t.a. (see: Ehrhardt Semi Bold 573)
 Placard
 506: Placard Bold Condensed No.1 Roman
 composition matrices: UA.387 = 6D-12D

 display matrices:

 515: Placard Bold Condensed No.2 Roman
 display matrices:

 568: Placard Condensed Roman (synonym: 568 Placard Medium Condensed)
 composition matrices: UA.387 = 6D-12D

 display matrices:

 522: Placard Condensed Roman (see: 522 Placard Condensed Titling)
 522: Placard Condensed Titling Roman (synonym: 522 Placard Condensed)
 display matrices:

 505: Placard light Extra Condensed Roman
 composition matrices: UA.387 = 10D

 display matrices:

 568: Placard Medium Condensed (see: 568 Placard Condensed)
 Plantin
 110: Plantin Roman/italic
 composition matrices: UA.4 = 5.5pt-12pt, UA.4a= 13.5pt, UA.363 = 14pt

 large composition matrices:

 display matrices:

 194: Plantin Bold Roman/italic
 can be combined with: 110 Plantin and 113/773 Plantin light
 composition matrices: Roman UA.5 = 6pt-12pt, italic UA.3 = 6pt-12pt, UA.5a= 13.5pt, UA.158/159 = 14pt

 display matrices:

 287: Plantin Bold (synonym: 287 Plantin Heavy No.2) (cancelled in 1968)
 composition matrices: UA.5 = 6.5pt-7.5pt

 236: Plantin Bold Condensed Roman/italic
 composition matrices: UA.72 = 6pt-14pt

 display matrices:

 289: Plantin Condensed Roman/italic (cancelled in 1967)
 composition matrices: UA.4 = 7.5ptt

 194: Plantin Heavy (see: 194 Plantin Bold)
 236: Plantin Heavy Condensed (see: 236 Plantin Bold Condensed)
 287: Plantin Heavy No.2 (see: 287 Plantin Bold)
 113: Plantin Light Roman/italic
 composition matrices: UA.4 = 6pt-12pt

 large composition matrices:

 display matrices:

 773: Plantin Light Roman/italic
 113: Plantin Light Face (see: 113 Plantin Light)
 composition matrices: UA.4 = 10pt-11pt
 The two sizes of Series 773 are alternatives for Series 113, with identical set and lining´, for use in combination with Series 194 and 663. Other sizes of Series 113 comply with this.

 281: Plantin Old Style No.2 (cancelled in 1967)
 composition matrices: UA.305 = 9pt-11pt

 663: Plantin Semi Bold Roman/italic
 composition matrices: Roman=UA.5, italic= UA.3, 6pt-12pt

 438: Plantin Titling Roman
 display matrices:

 Plate Gothic
 139: Plate Gothic (see: 139 Spartan Light)
 140: Plate Gothic (see: 140 Spartan)
 141: Plate Gothic (see: 141 Spartan Bold)
 142: Plate Gothic (see: 142 Spartan Light Condensed)
 143: Plate Gothic (see: 143 Spartan Condensed)
 145: Plate Gothic (see: 145 Spartan Wide)
 144: Plate Gothic Italic (see: 144 Spartan Italic)
 Poliphilus
 170: Poliphilus Roman
 composition matrices: UA.53: 10pt - 13pt, for the italic see: 119 Blado Italic

 large-composition matrices: 16pt = UA.139

 display matrices:

 230: Poliphilus Titling Roman
 display matrices in 2 sizes

 Poltawski
 394, Poltawski Roman
 composition matrices: UA.156: 6D, 8D, 10D, 12D

 398: Poltawski Bold Roman
 composition matrices: UA.156: 6D, 8D, 10D, 12D

 Prayer Bookface
532: Prayer Book Face (OUP) (cancelled)

R
 Rockwell
 371: Rockwell Roman/italic
 composition matrices: UA.338 = 6-14pt:

 display matrices:

 391: Rockwell Bold Roman/italic
 composition matrices: UA.338 = 6-14pt, combines with: 371 Rockwell

 display matrices:

 359: Rockwell Bold Condensed Roman
 composition matrices: UA.411 = 11pt

 display matrices:

 414: Rockwell Condensed Roman
 display matrices:

 424: Rockwell Extra Bold Roman
 composition matrices: UA.162 = 6-12pt

 display matrices:

 424: Rockwell Extra Heavy (see: 424 Rockwell Extra Bold)
 391: Rockwell Heavy (see: 391 Rockwell Bold)
 359: Rockwell Heavy Condensed (see: 359 Rockwell Bold Condensed)
 390: Rockwell Light Roman/italic
 composition matrices: UA.338 = 6-14pt

 display matrices:

 582: Rockwell Light Condensed (Film Sub-titles) Roman/italic
 175: Rockwell Shadow Roman
 display matrices:

 175: Rockwell Shadow Titling (see: Rockwell Shadow)
 Romulus
 458: Romulus Roman/italic
 Jan van Krimpen started in 1931 with the design of this typeface, which eventually led to a whole font family. With the permission of the firm Enschede & Sons in Haarlem,  "Series 458" was cut in 1936. It was a contemporary font that combined characteristics of many old fonts. The colour is matched to antique characters, but the serifs are almost horizontal and vertical. The font runs quite wide and the color is fairly light. The italic is an experiment: the oblique Roman is of the same width as the Roman.
 composition matrices: UA.405 = 8D-14D

 large composition: UA.406

 display matrices:

 520: Romulus Bold Roman/italic (synonym: 520 Van Krimpen Bold)
 composition matrices: UA.405 = 8D-14D

 Ronaldson
 _10: Ronaldson Roman/italic
 composition matrices: UA-1 (6-12pt) (synonym: Ronaldson Old style)
 
 _10: Ronaldson Old Style (see: Ronaldson)
 Runic Condensed
 420 : Runic Condensed Roman

S
 Sabon
 This font was designed by Jan Tschichold. Characters for hand composing can (still) be ordered from the company  D. Stempel AG (foundry) in formerly Frankfurt (now Darmstadt); Linotype matrices were available at Linotype GmbH (Berlin and Frankfurt); and Monotype matrices could be ordered from the Monotype Setzmachinen-Fabrik GMbH (Frankfurt and Berlin). This can still be done at the Type Museum in London, because the "patterns" and punches and production archives survived there.

The shape of the letter was identical for all three systems. Hand-composing type could be mixed with Linotype and Monotype composition rules. The letter had a limited success. There was also criticism: the letter suffered from the combined disadvantages of the three systems. For example: the Roman and italic faces are as wide as those on a Linotype matrix when combined. And Jan van Krimpen had objections to what he considered the too rigid unit-system of Monotype.

 669: Sabon Roman/italic
 composition matrices: UA.503 8D-12D

 693: Sabon Semi-Bold Roman
 composition matrices: UA.503 8D-12D

 Sachsenwald Mager
 499: Sachsenwald Mager (cancelled in 1965)
 Sans Serif
 _15: Sans-Serif (see: 15 Grotesque Bold Condensed No.2)
 _81: Sans-Serif (see: 81 Grotesque Bold Condensed)
 267: Sans-Serif (cancelled in 1965)
 318: Sans-Serif Condensed (see: 318 Grotesque Condensed)
 Schmale Nürnburger Gotisch
 186: Schmale Nürnburger Gotisch fraktuur (cancelled in 1965)
 display matrices in 6 sizes

 Schoeffer
 _22: Schoeffer (cancelled in 1964)
 composition matrices UA.2, 8pt, 10pt, 12 pt

 Schurmann Antiqua Halbfette
 _52: Schurmann Antiqua Halbfette Roman (synonym: 52 Modern Mediaeval (Half-Fat) (cancelled in 1967)
 Scotch Roman
 _46: Scotch Roman Roman/italic
 composition matrices: UA.1 = 6-12pt

 137: Scotch Roman Roman/italic
 composition matrices: 8-12pt

 large composition: UA.144 = Roman, UA.151 = italic

 display matrices:

 Script
 322: Script (see: 322 Script Bold)
 574: Script Ashley (see: 574 Ashley Script)
 322: Script Bold script
 display matrices:

 436: Script Dorchester (see: 436 Dorchester Script)
 493: Script Grosvenor (see: 493 Grosvenor Script)
 475: Script Light
 display matrices:

 351: Script Monoline (see: 351 Monoline Script)
 429: Script Palace (see: 429 Palace Script)
 455: Script Temple (see: 455 Temple Script)
 385: Script Wenceslas (see: 385 Wenceslas Script) (cancelled in 196?)
 Shadow French
 434: Shadow French (cancelled)
 Shakespeare Titling
 234: Shakespeare Titling (cancelled in 1967)
 display matrices:

 Sheldon
 552: Sheldon
 Solus
 276: Solus Roman (cancelled in 1967)
 composition matrices: UA.320 = 12pt-14pt

 display matrices:

 368: Solus Bold Roman (cancelled in 1967)
 composition matrices: UA.320 = 12pt-14pt

 368: Solus Heavy (see: Solus Bold)
 Spartan
 Imitation of stone inscriptions of chopped capitals: the font contains only capital letters, numbers, and punctuation. Each size has of the capitals four sizes, which can be combined, with the little ones functioning as lower case.
 140: Spartan Roman
 composition matrices: UA.16 = 6-12pt

 large composition: UA.157 = 24pt

 display matrices:

 141: Spartan Bold Roman
 composition matrices: UA.18 = 6-12pt

 display matrices:

 143: Spartan Condensed Roman
 composition matrices: UA.18 = 6-12pt

 144: Spartan Italic italic
 composition matrices: UA.18 = 6-12pt

 139: Spartan Light Roman
 composition matrices: UA.18 = 6-12pt

 display matrices:

 142: Spartan Light Condensed Roman
 composition matrices: UA.18 = 6-12pt

 145: Spartan Wide Roman
 composition matrices: UA.18 = 6-12pt

 Spectrum
 556: Spectrum Roman/italic
 This font designed by Jan van Krimpen was originally intended for printing a Bible at the Spectrum publishing house in Utrecht (Netherlands). The project was cancelled. Nevertheless, the font was rather successful. Therefore, in collaboration with Enschede & Sons it was decided to cut the complete series. The font is open and seems fairly robust. The character produces  a fairly compact composition.
 composition matrices: UA. 428 = 6D-12D

 display matrices:

 Surrey Old Style
 196: Surrey Old Style Roman (cancelled in 1967)
 display matrices:

 Swing Bold
 583: Swing Bold script
 display matrices:

T
 Temple Script
 455: Temple Script
 composition matrices: UA.386 = 10D-12D

 display matrices:

 The Times
 355: The Times Hever Titling Roman (synonym: 355 Times Hever Titling)
 composition matrices: UA.323 = 9pt-12pt

 display matrices:

 Times
 334: Times Bold Roman/italic
 to be used in combination with Times New Roman Series 327
 composition matrices: Roman = UA.324, italic = UA 325, 5.5pt-14pt
 matrices for long-descenders are available in several sizes

 display matrices:

 345: Times Bold No.2 Roman (see also: 360 Times Bold)
 composition matrices: UA.324 = 5pt-6pt

 360: Times Bold Roman
 composition matrices: UA.324 = 5pt-6pt

 328: Times Bold Titling No.2 Roman
 composition matrices: UA.324 = 5pt-6pt

 display matrices:

 332: Times Bold Titling Roman
 display matrices:

 639: Times Cosmoli Titling (cancelled in 1966)
 339: Times Extended Titling Roman
 composition matrices: UA.327 = 7pt-14pt

 display matrices:

 569: Times Four-line Mathematics
 355: Times Hever Titling (see:355 The Times Hever Titling)
 333: Times Newspaper Smalls
 335: Times Newspaper Smalls
 329: Times Titling Roman
 composition matrices: UA.328 = 14pt

 display matrices:

 358: Times Titling (cancelled in 1967)

 Times New Roman
 327: Times New Roman Roman/italic
 421: Times New Roman Semi-bold Roman/italic
 composition matrices: UA.325 = 7pt-14pt

 display matrices:

 427: Times New Roman Wide Roman/italic
 627: Times New Roman Book Roman/italic
 Series 627 consist of the special "long-descender" characters and the normal "non-descender" characters of Series 427
 composition matrices: UA.327 = 7pt-14pt

 large composition: UA.426, 14pt only Roman

 display matrices:

 474: Times New Roman Heavy Book (destroyed in a bombardment)
 727: Times New Roman (Light Caps) Roman
 827: Times New Roman (French) Roman/italic (see: Times New Roman 727)
 alternative matrices for: 
small capitals and Roman capitals C G Q R Ç 
italic capitals C Q R and lower case g and k  
 composition matrices: UA.325 = 6pt-12pt

 Titling
 179: Titling (see: 179 Modern Titling)
 synonyms: 179 Titling Modern No.1, 179 Titling Italic
 180: Titling (see: 180 Victoria Bold Condensed Titling) (synonym: 180 Victoria Bold Condensed)
 181: Titling (see: 181 Victoria Condensed Titling)
 182: Titling (see: 182 Victoria Titling)
 183: Titling (see: 183 Modern)
 209: Titling (see: 209 Caslon Titling)
 234: Titling (see: 234 Shakespeare Titling)
 440: Titling (cancelled in 1965)
 522: Titling (see: 522 Placard Condensed Titling)
 332: Titling Bold (The Times) (see: 332 Times Bold Titling)
 __H: Titling (Caps) Roman
 180: Titling Condensed (see: 180 Victoria Bold Condensed Titling)
 339: Titling Extended (The Times) (see: 339 Times Extended Titling)
 328: Titling Heavy (The Times) (see: 328 Times Bold Titling)
 355: Titling Hever (The Times) (see: 355 Times Hever Titling)
 179: Titling Italic (cancelled before 1966) (see: 179 Modern Titling)
 synonyms: 179 Titling 179 Modern Titling No. 1
 179: Titling Modern No.1 (see: 179 Modern Titling)
 synonyms: 179 Titling, 179 Titling Italic
 329: Titling (The Times) (see: 329 Times Titling)
 Tonic-Sol-Fa
 325; Tonic-Sol-Fa
 Traveller
 629: Traveller Roman
 display matrices:

 Treyford
 226: Treyford
 Trojan
 114: Trojan Roman (cancelled in 1967)
 composition matrices: UA.81 = 9pt-11pt

 display matrices:

 Typewriter
 Typewriter is a general style of fonts. All characters are of the same width, or "monospaced"; they are cast with a "flat" wedge. Consequently, all the typewriter font characters are cast with the same die case layout, key banks and wedge. There was more than enough space for all the underlined characters in the die case as well.
 Printers used these fonts to print mailings for large companies. The print was made to look like a hand-typed personal letter. The press was covered with previously used, worn paper combined with a thin cloth silk tissue. In this way, the type did not receive equal pressure and ink on the paper. Thus it appeared that the letter was typed by a somewhat inexperienced secretary.
 _82: Typewriter No.1 Roman
 composition matrices: UA.28 = 10pt-12pt

 100: Typewriter No.2 Roman (see: 100 Typewriter 82)
 105: Typewriter No.3 Roman (see: 105 Typewriter 82)
 127: Typewriter No.4 Roman
 composition matrices: UA.28 = 8pt-12pt

 235: Typewriter No.5 Elite Roman (see: 235 Typewriter 82)
 301: Typewriter No.6 Elite Roman (see: 301 Typewriter 82)
 602: Typewriter IBM "Executive" Roman
 This font is an exception to the rule: it has character of different widths, "unit values". Therefore, a special wedge was needed to cast it. The keyboard also needed additional equipment: the key bars, a kind of mechanical arrangement to translate the keystrokes on the keyboard into the punches in the ribbon. For the print shop it was a very expensive font to purchase.
 Underlined character were cast at 12 pt, with a 2pt wide stripe (Rule R39 2pt)
 composition matrices: UA.442 = 14pt

 _82: Typewriter Underlined Roman
 100: Typewriter Underlined Roman
 105: Typewriter Underlined Roman

U
 Ultra Bodoni
 120: Ultra Bodoni (see: 120 Bodoni Ultra Bold)
 Univers
 Univers was developed in cooperation with the French type foundry Deberny & Peignot.
 It was possible to cast characters in lining with the character bought in France.
 693: Univers Bold Roman/italic
 composition matrices: UA.486 = 5D-12D, extra &: S16511, S16512, superior: L225,

 display matrices:

 694: Univers Bold Condensed Roman/italic
 692: Univers Bold Expanded Roman
 composition matrices: UA.491 = 6D-10D, extra &: S16511, superior: L228,

 display matrices:

 696: Univers Extra Bold Roman
 composition matrices: UA.484 = 5D-12D, extra &: S16511, S16512, superior: L223, inferior: L255

 display matrices:

 695: Univers Extra Bold Expanded Roman/italic
 composition matrices: UA.491 = 6D-10D, extra &: S16511, superiors: L268,

 display matrices:

 684: Univers Extra Light Extra Condensed Roman/italic
 display matrices: , extra &: S16511, superior: L292,

 685: Univers Light Roman/italic
 composition matrices: UA.483 = 6D-12D, extra &: S16511, S16512, superior: L295,

 display matrices:

 686: Univers Light Condensed Roman/italic
 composition matrices: UA.492 = 5D-12D, extra &: S16511, S16512, superiors: L250,

 display matrices:

 687: Univers Light Extra Condensed Roman/italic
 composition matrices: UA.501 = 10D-12D, extra &: S16511, superior: L292,

 display matrices:

 689: Univers Medium Roman/italic
 composition matrices: UA.483 = 5D-12D, extra &: S16511, S16512, superiors: L222, inferiors: L254

 display matrices:

 690: Univers Medium Condensed Roman/italic
 composition matrices: UA.484 = 5D-12D, extra &: S16511, S16512 , superior: L251
 5D was not supplied after 1969

 display matrices:

 688: Univers Medium Expanded Roman
 composition matrices: UA.484 = 6D-10D, extra &: S16511, superior: L266

 display matrices:

 691: Univers Medium Extra Condensed Roman
 composition matrices: UA.500 = 8D-12D, extra &: S16511, superior: L263

 display matrices:

 697: Univers Ultra Bold Expanded Roman
 composition matrices: UA.490 = 6D-10D, extra &: S16511, superior: L269

 display matrices:

V
 Van Dijck
 203: Van Dijck Roman.italic
 composition matrices: UA.354 = 7pt-14pt

 large composition: UA.423

 display matrices:

 Van Krimpen Bold
 520: Van Krimpen Bold (see: 520 Romulus Bold)
 Veronese
 _59: Veronese (cancelled in 1967)
 composition matrices: UA.4 = 11pt-12pt

 large-composition matrices:

 display matrices:

 Victoria
 180: Victoria Bold Condensed  Roman (see: 180 Victoria Bold Condensed Titling)
 180: Victoria Bold Condensed Titling Roman (synonym: 180 Victoria Bold Condensed)
 composition matrices: UA.49 = 10pt-12pt

 display matrices:

 181: Victoria Condensed Titling Roman
 composition matrices: UA.50 = 12pt

 display matrices:

 182: Victoria Titling Roman (synonym: 182 Titling)
 display matrices:

W
 Walbaum
 374: Walbaum Roman/italic
 composition matrices: UA.349 = 6D-12D,  UA.351 = 14pt, UA.352 = 14D, UA.353 = 16D

 display matrices:

 674: Walbaum Roman/italic (see: 374 Walbaum)
 375: Walbaum Medium Roman/italic
 composition matrices: UA.349 = 6D-12D,  UA.351 = 14pt, UA.352 = 14D, UA.353 = 16D

 display matrices:

 Wenceslas Script script
 385: Wenceslas Script (cancelled in 1967)
 display matrices:

 Designed by Karel Svolinsky, (11 January 1896, Heiligenberg near Olmütz, Mähren - 16 September 1986, Prague) Czech painter, graphic designer and book illustrator. He studied at the school of arts and crafts in Prague. Later, he taught as a Professor at this University. Svolinsky Antiqua (1925), Wenceslas Script(1933) Grotesk(1943)
 One incomplete set survives at the BookArtMuseum, Lodz, Poland
 Wide Gothic
 _97: Wide Gothic Roman (see: 97 Grotesque Bold)
 Wide Latin
 164: Wide Latin Roman (see: 164 Latin Wide)
 Wigan Condensed
 273: Wigan Condensed (cancelled in 1965)
 display matrices:

 Worcester Old Face
 123: Worcester Old Face (cancelled in 1965)

Fraktur
 _89: Fraktur Antiqua Roman (cancelled voor 1966) (see also Neudeutsche Fraktur)
 _98: Alte 'Monotype' Fraktur (cancelled in 1972)
 composition matrices: UA. 5F

 display matrices:

 449: Alte 'Monotype' Fraktur Halbfette (see: Alte Fraktur Fette)
 102: Alte Schwabacher (cancelled in 1972)
 _31: Armin Fraktur
 _32: Armin Fraktur Fette
 _34: Armin Fraktur Halbfette
 _37: Bamberger Fraktur (cancelled in 1967)
 _49: Bamberger Fraktur Fette (cancelled in 1967)
 _48: Bamberger Fraktur Halbfette (cancelled in 1964)
 521: Berliner Fraktur (cancelled in 1965)
 387: Blücher Fraktur Fette (cancelled in 1967)
 116: Breitkopf Fraktur (cancelled in 1972)
 367: Breitkopf Fraktur (cancelled in 1972)
 256: Breitkopf Fraktur Fette (cancelled in 1972)
 413: Breitkopf Fraktur Halbfette
 256: Dürer Fraktur
 513: Dürer Fraktur Fette (cancelled in 1965)
 512: Dürer Fraktur Halbfette (cancelled in 1965)
 363: Enge Fraktur Halbfette (cancelled in 1967)
 498: Enschedé Fraktur (cancelled in 1967)
 296: Erfurter Fraktur (cancelled in 1964)
 379: Essener Fraktur Fette (cancelled in 1967)
 _38: Fraktur (cancelled in 1964)
 _94: Große Moderne Fraktur (cancelled in 1967)
 308: Helen Fraktur (cancelled in 1964)
 384: Hessen Fraktur (cancelled in 1964)
 202: Hessen Fraktur Halbfette (cancelled in 1964)
 417: Hessen Fraktur Halbfette (cancelled in 1964)
 315: Hutten Fraktur (cancelled in 1964)
 423: Jean Paul Fraktur (cancelled in 1967)
 _40: Kasseler Fraktur
 _41: Kasseler Fraktur Halbfette
 _56: Koelner Fraktur
 _58: Koelner Fraktur halbfette
 118: Mainzer Fraktur
 132: Mainzer Fraktur Halbfette
 _64: Moderne Fraktur
 _66: Moderne Fraktur Fette
 _86: Moderne Schwabacher
 _93: Moderne Schwabacher Halbfette
 _35: Neue Schwabacher
 _36: Neue Schwabacher
 463: Rundgotisch
 186: Schmale Nürnburger Gotisch (cancelled in 1965)
 display matrices in 6 sizes

 187: Schmalfette Frankfurter Fraktur
 display matrices in 7 sizes

 483: Uhlen Rundgotisch
 205: Unger Fraktur
 277: Unger Fraktus Halbfette
 _28: Wittenberg Fraktur
 _29: Wittenberg Fraktur
 _83: Wuerzburger Fraktur

Non-latin-typefaces

Amharic
 599: Amharic
 composition matrices: 9D-12D

 display matrices: 14D
 624: Amharic
 composition matrices: 10D

Arabic
 409: Arabic (cancelled in 1946. replaced by series 549)
 542: Arabic Bold (destroyed in a bombardement)
 415: Arabic Display (cancelled in 1950)
 549: Arabic Naskh
 composition matrices: 8D-18D, for 8D a special mould was needed.

 display matrices:

 589: Arabic Naskh Accented
 large composition matrices:

 649: Arabic Naskh Bold
 composition matrices: 8D-18D

 display matrices:

 559: Arabic Solloss
 Display matrices:

 507: (see: 507 Urdu)
 707: (see: 707 Urdu)
 721: Farsi
 composition matrices: 10D-12D

 display matrices:

Armenian
 638: Armanian
 composition matrices: 8D-12D

Bangali
 470: Bengali
 composition matrices: 8D-12D

 700: Bengali
 composition matrices: 8D-12D

 701: Bengali Bold
 composition matrices: 8D-12D

 670: Bengali Bold (cancelled in 1967)

Burmese
 558: Burmese Light
 composition matrices: 12pt-18pt

 578: Burmese Bold
 composition matrices: 12pt-18pt

Chinese
 633: Chinese (cancelled in 1974)
 133: Chu Yin (cancelled in 1967)

Coptic
 609: Louvain Coptic

Cyrillic
 (Russian, Serbian, Bulgarian and Macedonian)
 _42: Albion
 composition matrices: 6.5(6D)-13pt(12D)

 _63: Albion
 composition matrices: 9(8D)-13pt(12D)

 _70: Albion
 composition matrices: 6.5(6D)-13pt(12D)

 169: Baskerville (Russian) Roman / italic
 composition matrices: 9pt-11pt

 display matrices: Roman

 370: Bembo Titling
 display matrices: 36pt-42pt

 260: Bodoni Bold Roman / italic
 display matrices: 14pt-72pt

 529: Bodoni Bold Condensed
 display matrices: 14pt-36pt

 120: Bodoni Ultra Bold (Cyrillic) Roman
 display matrices: 14pt-42pt

 _17: Cushing (cancelled in 1967)
 _68: French Old Style
 composition matrices: 6.5(6D)-13pt(12D)

 _69: French Old Style Bold
 composition matrices: 6.5(6D)-13pt(12D)

 display matrices:

 _44: French Round Face
 composition matrices: 6.5pt-13pt

 201: Garamond Bold (Cyrillic Roman
 display matrices:

 262: Gill Sans
 composition matrices: 6pt-12pt

 display matrices:

 275: Gill Sans Bold
 composition matrices: 6pt-12pt

 display matrices:

 373: Gill Sans Bold Condensed Titling
 display matrices:

 233: Gill Sans Cameo Roman
 display matrices:

 485: Gill Sans Condensed
 display matrices: 14pt-36pt

 362: Gill Sans Light
 composition matrices: 6pt-12pt

 display matrices:

 _96: Gothic (cancelled in 1965)
 _51: Grotesque
 composition matrices: 6pt-12pt

 display matrices:

 _97: Grotesque Bold (cancelled in 1967)
 _11: Grotesque Bold Condensed (cancelled in 1967)
 166: Grotesque Bold Condensed (Cyrillic) Roman (synonym: 166 Grotesque Bold Condensed Titling)
 display matrices:

 166: Grotesque Bold Condensed Titling Roman (see: 166 Grotesque Bold Condensed (Cyrillic))
 _33: Grotesque Condensed Roman
 composition matrices: 6pt-13pt

 display matrices:

 383: Grotesque Condensed Roman
 composition matrices: 6pt-13pt

 display matrices:

 383: Grotesque Condensed
 composition matrices: 6D-12D

 display matrices:

 _39: Modern Condensed
 composition matrices: 6.5pt-13pt

 _77: Modern Extended (cancelled in 1967)
 _75: Modern Wide (cancelled in 1967)
 _27: Neo Didot
 composition matrices: 6.5pt-13pt

 506: Placard Bold Condensed
 display matrices:

 515: Placard Bold Condensed
 display matrices:

 568: Placard Condensed
 display matrices:

 522: Placard Condensed Titling
 display matrices:

 194: Plantin Bold (Russian) Roman
 composition matrices: 6pt-12pt

 display matrices:

 113: Plantin Light (Russian)  Roman / italic
 composition matrices: 6pt-12pt

 display matrices:

 327: Times New Roman
 composition matrices: 6pt-12pt

 display matrices:

 334: Times Bold
 composition matrices: 6pt-12pt

 display matrices:

Devenagari
 155: Devenagari
 composition matrices: 12pt-16pt

 display matrices:

 346: Devenagari Bold
 composition matrices: 10pt-16pt, voor 10pt is een speciale gietvorm nodig

 755: Devenagari Italic
 composition matrices: 10pt-16pt

 Display matrices 18pt, 24pt, 30pt, 36pt

Gaelic
 _24: Gaelic
 composition matrices: UA.23: 8pt, 10pt, 12 pt, UA.108: 14 pt, 18pt, UA.109: 24 pt

 large composition matrices: UA.108 = 14 pt, 18pt, UA.109 = 24 pt

 display matrices: 14pt - 72pt

 117: Gaelic (see: 117 Gaelic Sans-Serif)
 121: Colum Cille (see: 121 Gaelic Colm Cille)
 121: Gaelic Colm Cille
 _85: Gaelic Display
 117: Gaelic Display (see: 117 Gaelic Sans-Serif)
 117: Gaelic Sans Serif

Georgian
 539: Georgian Light (cancelled in 1972)
 display matrices: 16D

 540: Georgian Bold (cancelled in 1972)
 display matrices: 24D

 587: Georgian
 composition matrices: 8D-10D

Glagolitic
 598: Glagolitic (see also: 597 Old Bulgarian)
 composition matrices: 12pt:

Greek
 259: Antigone
 composition matrices: UA.432 = 13pt:

 672: Gill Sans Bold Upright
 is used as "bold" in combination with series 571 & 572
 585: Gill Sans Condensed
 display matrices:

 625: Gill Sans Bold Upright
 composition matrices: UA.452 = 8-12pt:

 display matrices:

 571: Gill Sans Inclined italic
 Is used as italic in combination with series 572 and 672, data similar with Series 572:
 572: Gill Sans Upright Roman
 composition matrices: UA.451 = 8-12pt:

 display matrices:

 473: Greek (cancelled in 1967)
 _91: Greek: Inclined
 composition matrices: UA.26 = 6-13pt:

 _92: Greek: Bold Upright (see also: 92 Greek Upright Display)
 composition matrices: UA.26 = 6-13pt:

 472: Greek: Inclined
 composition matrices: UA.434 = 8-11pt:

 _90: Greek: Upright
 composition matrices: UA.26 = 6-13pt:

 _92: Greek Upright Display (Synoniem: 92 Greek Bold Upright)
 composition matrices: UA.27 = 9-13pt:

 683: Grotesque Condensed Upright
 display matrices: 14D-36D

 718: Grotesque Condensed Upright
 display matrices: 14pt-36pt

 486: Heavy Greek (see: 486 Sans-Serif)
 192: New Hellenic Greek
 composition matrices: UA.73 = 7-12pt:

 display matrices:

 553: Old Style Bold Inclined
 composition matrices: UA.436 = 9-11pt:

 283: Perpetua (cancelled in 1967)
 605: Placard Extra Light Condensed
 display matrices: 14D-36D

 668: Placard Condensed Upright
 display matrices: 14D-36D

 106: Porson
 composition matrices: UA.26 = 5.5-12pt:

 404: Porson Condensed (cancelled in 1967)
 486: Greek: Sans Serif
 composition matrices: UA.415 = 8-10pt:

 739: Spartan Light Upright
 Only capitals in 4 sizes, the small sizes are used as lower case with the larger sizes
 composition matrices: UA.454 = 6-12pt:

 740: Spartan Upright
 Only capitals in 4 sizes, the small sizes are used as lower case with the larger sizes
 composition matrices: UA.454 = 6-12pt:

 741: Spartan Bold Upright
 Only capitals in 4 sizes, the small sizes are used as lower case with the larger sizes
 composition matrices: UA.454 = 6-12pt:

 565: Times Upright
 composition matrices: UA.437 = 6-12pt:

 display matrices:

 566: Times Inclined was used as italic with Series 565 Times Upright
 composition matrices: UA. 438 = 6pt-12pt, large composition matrices 14pt-18pt, (lining-data more equal)
 567: Times Bold Upright
 composition matrices: UA.439 = 6-12pt:

 display matrices:

 667: Times Bold Inclined 
 composition matrices: UA.439 = 6-12pt:

 display matrices:

 893: Univers Bold Upright
 composition matrices: UA.439 = 6-12pt:

 989: Univers Medium Inclined
 composition matrices: UA.439 = 6-12pt:

 889: Univers Medium Upright
 composition matrices: UA.439 = 6-12pt:

Gujerathi
 460: Gujerathi
 composition matrices:

 518: Gujerathi Bold
 composition matrices:

 display matrices:

 704: Gujerathi
 composition matrices:

Gurmukhi
 601: Gurmukhi Bold
 composition matrices: 12-16pt:

 604: Gurmukhi
 composition matrices: 12-16pt:

 604: Gurmukhi Light (see: 604 Gurmukhi)

Hebrew
 219: Ashurith (unpointed)
 composition matrices: 7-8pt:

 487: Gill (cancelled in 1967)
 222: Hebrew
 composition matrices: 6-8pt:

 219: Hebrew Ashurith (see: 219 Ashurith)
 221: Hebrew Levenim (see: 221 Levenim)
 220: Hebrew Peninim (see: 220 Peninim)
 228: Hebrew Rabbinic (see: 228 Rabinnic)
 547: Hebrew Schocken No.1 (cancelled in 1974)
 550: Hebrew Schocken No.2 (cancelled in 1967)
 551: Hebrew Schocken No.3 (cancelled in 1967)
 218: Hebrew Sonzino (pointed) (see: 218 Sonzino)
 221: Levênim (unpointed)
 composition matrices: 7pt:

 492: Mayer
 488: Mayer Pointed
 220: Peninim (unpointed)
 composition matrices: 5-7pt:

 display matrices: size: 14pt, 18pt, 24pt
 489: Peninim
 217: Peninim Pointed
 composition matrices: 6-8pt:

 228: Rabbinic
 composition matrices: 11-12pt:

 218: Sonzino
 composition matrices: 9-12pt: extra point-matrices available for 9pt, when cast at 9pt Didot

 display matrices: 18pt point S5469 to S5476 cast at 6 point

Kannada
 588: Kannada
 composition matrices: 10-16pt:

 590: Kannada (see: 590 Malayalam)
 788: Kannada
 787: Kannada Semi-Bold

Malayalam
 590: Malayalam (synonym: 590 Kannada)
 composition matrices: 10-12pt:

 660: Malayalam
 composition matrices: 8pt:

Old Bulgarian
 597: Old Bulgarian (see also: 598 Glagolitic)
 composition matrices: 10-12pt:

Oriya
 706: Oriya

Sangalese
 557: Sangalese
 composition matrices: 8-14pt:

 657: Sangalese Bold
 composition matrices: 8-14pt:

 698: Sangalese Italic
 composition matrices: 8-14pt:

 699: Sangalese Bold Italic
 composition matrices: 8-14pt:

Syriac
 564: Syriac "Estrangelo"
 composition matrices: 8-10pt:

Tamil
 280: Tamil
 composition matrices:

 340: Tamil Bold
 composition matrices: 8pt-10pt

 display matrices:

 581: Tamil Bold (cancelled)
 340: Tamil Heavy (see: 340 Tamil Bold)
 580: Tamil Medium\
 composition matrices:

 708: Tamil Medium
 composition matrices:

Telugu
 426: Telugu (cancelled in 1969)
 626: Telugu Medium
 composition matrices:

 726: Telugu Bold

Thai
 577: Thai
 composition matrices:

 608: Thai Light
 composition matrices:

 611: Thai Bold
 composition matrices:

 621: Thai Medium
 display matrices:

 628: Thai Light Italic
 composition matrices:

Urdu
 507: Urdu
 composition matrices: 9D-16D

 707: Urdu Bold
 composition matrices: 9D-16D

 display matrices:

External links
De website van de Alembic-Press
 the site of David Bolton, with much info on Monotype and letterpress.
Het Typemuseum
 The website of the Type Museum in London, where matrices are still produced with the old machines. This website is offline at this moment (2017).
Monotype Inc
 Monotype Inc. for digital fonts.
Monotype Corsiva
 Monotype digital fonts

References

 
Typography